Ironbank is a 4,500-m2, six-level mixed-used (retail and office) development on Karangahape Road, Auckland city centre, New Zealand. The building also provides a mechanical, automated car stacker for 96 cars, which the robotic system racks in a four-level storage wall. It also used a variety of environmentally friendly building facilities, such as reduced energy demands due to a design that can dispense with air conditioning.

The seven-storey building has both been criticised and lauded for looking like "rusting containers", and an architecture critic noted it reminded him of "kindergarten day in a shipping yard", calling it the "most complex and adventurous building" of RTA Studio (designed for Samson Corporation). The building is hoped to achieve 5-star Green Building certification.

In 2009, it received three architecture awards, in the "commercial", "sustainable" and "urban design" categories of the New Zealand Institute of Architects Auckland awards sponsored by the paint company Resene.  It then captured second place at the World Architecture Festival, a European award, making it the best-scoring New Zealand entrant ever at the festival, and being praised for "Its sophisticated attitude to the messy urbanity of south-central Auckland".

It was also mentioned in a The New Zealand Herald series where prominent Aucklanders nominated outstanding Auckland buildings constructed since 2000. Urban designer Ludo Campbell-Reid specifically noted that the building was greater than the sum  of its parts, that it would help re-invigorate Karangahape Road and its backstreets, and that unlike most buildings, it looked better from the back than from the front side.

See also
Green building in New Zealand

References

External links 

Ironbank (official website)

Buildings and structures in Auckland
2000s architecture in New Zealand
Sustainable buildings in New Zealand
Auckland CBD